"I Want You Back" is the title of a R&B single by Pure Soul. It was the second single from their debut album and produced by R&B/pop producer Teddy Riley. The tracks music video became a top-five most played on BET peaking at number two on the network.

Chart positions

References

1995 singles
Song recordings produced by Teddy Riley
1995 songs
Interscope Records singles
Songs written by Teddy Riley